Neogeophilidae is a family of centipedes belonging to the order Geophilomorpha.

Genera:
 Evallogeophilus Silvestri, 1918
 Neogeophilus Silvestri, 1918

References

Geophilomorpha